= Paracme =

Type of biozone in biostratigraphy

Paracme, as used in biostratigraphy, is a term that describes the interval of temporary disappearance or absence of a taxon. It defines the interval between when a taxon temporarily disappears and when it reappears in biostratigraphical observation. Paracme Base "PB" (lowest occurrence) is used to denote the start of the disappearance, and Paracme Top "PT" (highest occurrence) denotes the reappearance of the taxon.

== Notable examples ==
There are several instances where paracme have been reported in nannoplankton and sometimes used as a biostratigraphy marker.

- Reticulofenestra pseudoumbiliucus Paracme: a short time interval in the early Miocene during which R. pseudoumbilicus is absent or extremely rare compared with the underlying and overlying segments. The timing of the event is estimated to be between 8.8 Ma and 7.2 Ma in tropical areas. Studies have also shown that the timing of this interval varies significantly across latitudes, with much shorter durations reported in the mid-latitude regions
- Discoaster pentaradiatus Paracme: Interval of temporary absence of Discoaster pentaradiatus between ~3.90 Ma and 3..6 Ma.
- Discoaster tamalis Paracme
- Sphenolithus heteromorphus Paracme
